Ctenucha neglecta is a moth of the family Erebidae. It was described by Jean Baptiste Boisduval in 1832. It is found in Peru.

References

neglecta
Moths described in 1832